Bill Schmidt is an American baseball executive. Born August 1959.  He is the general manager of the Colorado Rockies of Major League Baseball.

Schmidt served as a scout for the Cleveland Indians, New York Yankees, Cincinnati Reds, and the Major League Baseball scouting bureau. He joined the Rockies organization in 1999. The Rockies named him their interim general manager on May 3, 2021, following the resignation of Jeff Bridich. On October 2, the Rockies hired Schmidt as their general manager.

References

Living people
Cleveland Indians scouts
New York Yankees scouts
Cincinnati Reds scouts
Colorado Rockies executives
Major League Baseball general managers
Year of birth missing (living people)